Rodowo Małe  is a village in the administrative district of Gmina Prabuty, within Kwidzyn County, Pomeranian Voivodeship, in northern Poland.

See also
 History of Pomerania

References

Villages in Kwidzyn County